Jimmy  may refer to:

Arts and entertainment

Film and television
 Jimmy (2008 film), a 2008 Hindi thriller directed by Raj N. Sippy
 Jimmy (1979 film), a 1979 Indian Malayalam film directed by Melattoor Ravi Varma
 Jimmy (2013 film), a 2013 drama directed by Mark Freiburger
 "The Jimmy", a 1995 episode of the sitcom Seinfeld
 "Jimmy", a 2002 episode of Static Shock
 "Jimmy", a 1989 episode of Quantum Leap

Music
 Jimmy (musical), a 1969 musical

Songs
 "Jimmy" (song), a song by M.I.A. from the 2007 album Kala
 "Jimmy", a song by Irving Berlin, see also List of songs written by Irving Berlin
 "Jimmy", a song by Tones and I from her EP The Kids Are Coming
 "Jimmy", a song by Tool from their 1996 album Ænima
 "Jimmy", a song by dutch artist Boudewijn de Groot
 "Jimmy", a song by Jay Thompson for the 1967 film Thoroughly Modern Millie

Theater 
 Jimmy Awards, annual awards given by the Broadway League to high school musical theater performers in the United States

People
 Jimmy (given name), including list of persons and fictional characters
 Jean Jimmy (1912–1991), Australian Aboriginal activist and politician
 Einar Gustafson, also known as "Jimmy", namesake of The Jimmy Fund charity program in Boston

Other uses
 Jimmy (TV channel), a satellite digital television channel in France
 Jimmy bar, a metal bar with a curved end used for forcing things open
 Jimmy hat, a slang term for a condom
 Jimmies, a decorative confection
 Doctor Jimmy, the main character from the rock opera Quadrophenia by the Who
 GMC Jimmy, several cars that share the name
 Hagström Jimmy, a guitar
 Jimmy, a groundhog of Sun Prairie, Wisconsin
 Jimmy, a nickname for the figure of Mercury on the insignia of some Signals Corps in the British army
 Jimmy Riddle, Cockney rhyming slang for urinating

See also
 Jimmy Jazz (disambiguation)
 Jimmy Jimmy (disambiguation)
 Jimmy legs (disambiguation)
 Jhimmy, a Congolese musician of the 1950s
 Jim (disambiguation)
 Jimi (disambiguation)
 Jimmie, a list of people with the name
 James (disambiguation)
 Jamey, a list of people with the name